Scotchy Pocket is a rural locality in the Gympie Region, Queensland, Australia.

History 
Scotchy Pocket Provisional School opened on 1900. On 1 January 1909 it became Scotchy Pocket State School. The school closed in 1920 due to low student numbers. It reopened in 1938 and finally closed circa 1944. It was located on Scotchy Pocket Road (approx ).

References 

Gympie Region
Localities in Queensland